The 1994 Toronto Argonauts finished in third place in the East Division with a 7–11 record. They appeared in an East Semi-Final game.

Offseason

Regular season

Standings

Schedule

Postseason

Awards and honours

1994 CFL All-Stars

References

Toronto Argonauts seasons